Linksys WAG300N is a Draft-N wireless gateway (router plus ADSL2+ modem) with two large captive antennae and 4 Ethernet ports. It was the smallest such device tested by MacUser, but the web interface was deemed "infuriating" and transfer rates to a MacBook "untenably slow". WAG300N is based on a Broadcom BCM63xx SoC, and runs a Linux-based firmware.

Last most recent official released firmware:
Product Versions:  (Annex A)/(Annex B)
Classification:    Firmware Release History
Release Date:      23 May 2008
Firmware-Version:  1.01.07 (ETSI)

References 

Linux-based devices
Hardware routers
Wireless networking hardware
Linksys